Whisper War is the debut studio album by American rock band The Cab. It was released on April 29, 2008 by Fueled By Ramen/Decaydance Records. The album was produced by Patrick Stump, who also provides vocals on "Bounce", "One of Those Nights", "I'm a Wonder" and sings backing vocals on other songs. Lead singer Alexander DeLeon's younger sister, Sophia, is the little girl on the album cover.

Background
The record features Brendon Urie of Panic! at the Disco and Patrick Stump of Fall Out Boy on the first single off the album, "One of Those Nights", which was co-written by Stump. The home videos for "I'll Run" and "One of Those Nights" feature members of Panic! at the Disco, while the latter also features Pete Wentz and Patrick Stump of Fall Out Boy. The song "Bounce" is available through free download and ships as a download code with a new copy of Rock Band 2. Also, "One of Those Nights" is featured as a playable song via an online purchase for the music game Rock Band.

Reception

On May 7, 2008, Whisper War debuted at number 108 on the US Billboard 200 and at number 1 on the Billboard Top Heatseekers chart where it stayed on for 17 weeks. The song "Bounce" reached number 69 on the defunct Pop 100 airplay chart. By October 2009, the album's sales stood at 67,000.

Track listing

Personnel
 Alexander DeLeon - lead vocals
 Cash Colligan - bass guitar, backing vocals
 Alex Johnson - drums, percussion
 Alex T. Marshall - rhythm guitar, piano, backing vocals
 Ian Crawford - lead guitar, backing vocals

Charts

Release history

References
 Citations

Sources

External links
 "One of THOSE Nights" music video on YouTube
 "I'll Run" music video on YouTube

2008 debut albums
Fueled by Ramen albums
The Cab albums